Moälven was a swedish tugboat built 1921 for Mo och Domsjö in Örnsköldsvik, Sweden and in use up to about 1970.

She was launched in 1921 as Moälven and was a conventionally-built timber rafting tugboat at Jerfeds Mekaniska Verkstad in Örnsköldsvik Municipality in Västernorrland County in Sweden.

Moälven was owned and used by the Mo och Domsjö company to pull logs rafted for towing from the areas along the river Moälven down to Domsjö Fabriker  in Örnsköldsvik.

She was sold to a private owner and converted from timber tugboat to pleasure craft round 1970.

Gallery

See also 
 Moälven

References

Tugboats of Sweden
1921 ships
Ships built in Örnsköldsvik